Toyota (Toyota Motor Corporation, or TMC) is a multinational corporation headquartered in the city of the same name in Japan.

Toyota may also refer to:

Organisations

Businesses
 Toyota Group
 Toyota Australia, a subsidiary of Toyota Motor Corporation
 Toyota Boshoku, a Japanese automotive component manufacturer
 Toyota Central R&D Labs., Inc., the arch institute of the Toyota Group. I; it cooperates with Toyota Group and Toyota Technological Institute
 Toyota Financial Services Corporation (TFSC), a wholly owned subsidiary of Toyota Motor Corporation (TMC) responsible for the financial services subsidiaries globally
 Toyota Industries, a Japanese machine maker
 Toyota Tsusho, a sōgō shōsha (trading company)
 Toyota Racing Development, the in-house tuning shop for all Toyota, Lexus and formerly Scion cars

Institutions
 Toyota Technological Institute, a university in Nagoya, Japan
 Toyota Technological Institute at Chicago, United States, for research and education in computer science

People with the surname
 Lauren Toyota, Canadian television personality
 Maho Toyota (born 1967), Japanese actress
 Manami Toyota, Japanese professional wrestler
 Moe Toyota, Japanese voice actress

Places
 Toyota, Aichi, a city in Aichi, Japan
 Toyota, Yamaguchi, a town in Toyoura District, Yamaguchi, Japan
 Toyota District, Hiroshima, a district in Hiroshima, Japan
 Toyota Prefectural Natural Park Yamaguchi, Japan

Sports

Events
 Toyota All-Star Showdown, an auto race in the United States
 Toyota Grand Prix of Long Beach, an auto race in the United States
 Toyota Pro/Celebrity Race, an auto race in the United States
 ToyotaCare 250, a NASCAR Xfinity Series race that takes place at Richmond Raceway in Richmond, Virginia
 2019 ToyotaCare 250, a NASCAR Xfinity Seriesrace held on April 12, 2019, at Richmond Raceway in Richmond, Virginia
 Toyota/Save Mart 350, an auto race in the United States

Teams
 Toyota Industries S.C., a Japanese football club, owned by Toyota Industries
 Toyota Industries Shuttles, a Japanese rugby union club, owned by Toyota Industries
 Toyota Super Corollas, a defunct basketball team in the Philippines
 Toyota Verblitz, a Japanese rugby union club, owned by Toyota Motor

Sports arenas
 Toyota Arena (disambiguation)
 Generali Arena or Toyota Arena, a sports stadium in Prague, Czech Republic
 Toyota Center (disambiguation)
 Toyota Center, a sports arena in Houston, Texas
 Toyota Sports Center, a sports stadium in El Segundo, California
 Toyota Park (disambiguation)
 Toyota Park, a sports stadium in Bridgeview, Illinois
 Toyota Stadium (disambiguation)
 Toyota Stadium (Cronulla), a sports stadium in Cronulla, New South Wales, Australia
 Toyota Stadium, a sports stadium in Toyota, Japan

Other uses
 The Toyota Way, a set of principles and behaviors that underlie the Toyota Motor Corporation's managerial approach and production system
 Toyota Production System, an integrated socio-technical system developed by Toyota

See also

 List of Toyota engines
 List of Toyota manufacturing facilities
 List of Toyota transmissions
 List of Toyota vehicles
 Toyoda (disambiguation)

Japanese-language surnames